The Uganda Industrial Research Institute (UIRI) is a parastatal company, wholly owned by the government of Uganda, whose primary objective is to carry out scientific and industrial research, develop competitive technical services, improve the capacity and competence of indigenous entrepreneurs to embark on sustainable industrial production, to  produce high quality marketable products, for the benefit of Uganda's citizens.

Location
The geographical coordinates of the institution's campus are: 0°20'10.0"N, 32°37'31.0"E (Latitude:0.336111; Longitude:32.625278).

Overview
UIRI was established by Act of Parliament in 2002, which was assented to and signed into law by the president of Uganda on 
30 July 2003. It is organised under the Uganda Ministry of Trade, Industry and Cooperatives. It is divided into several divisions and departments, and is led by an executive director, currently Charles Kwesiga.

One of the successes that UIRI has achieved is the award-winning invention of the ECGF (Electronically Controlled Gravity Feed Infusion Set), which controls the rate of fluid flow of intravenous (IV) fluids to prevent under-infusion or over-infusion. The research was led by Philippa Ngaju Makobore, an electrical engineer trained in Canada, the United States and South Africa.

As of 2014, the institute was plagued by underfunding and duplication of services by other government agencies.

See also
Uganda Investment Authority
Healthcare in Uganda
Nakawa Vocational Training Institute

References

External links
Website of Uganda Industrial Research Institute

Industry in Uganda
Organizations established in 2003
Kampala District
2003 establishments in Uganda
Government-owned companies of Uganda
Research in Uganda